Henri Devillers (1914 – 19 June 1942) was a V-mann (agent for penetration) for the Abwehr III F (Nazi counter-espionnage).

Devillers was taken prisoner in 1940, and obtained his freedom in exchange for promising to work for the German services who assigned to the Hachette messageries. Once a week, he made a link between Paris, Vichy and Lyon.

Introduced to the Lyon chapter of the Combat resistance organisation, he won the confidence of Henri Frenay,  and Berty Albrecht. He passed the mail to his German handler to read, before sending it on to its destination.

Devillers was detected by counter-espionnage of the armée de l'armistice and arrested by the Surveillance du Territoire towards the end of January 1942. Foiled, he was tried and sentenced to death. He was shot by a platoon of the Lyon garrison on 19 June 1942.

References 
 Vichy et la chasse aux espions nazis, Simon Kitson, ed. , 2004

1914 births
1942 deaths
Executed French collaborators with Nazi Germany
Double agents
People executed by Vichy France
Executed French people
World War II spies for Germany
Executed spies
People executed by France by firing squad
French prisoners of war in World War II
World War II prisoners of war held by Germany